Rapunzel Naturkost GmbH is a German company founded in 1974 that produces and sells vegetarian organic food. The company has its headquarters in Legau in Unterallgäu.

References

Companies based in Bavaria